"Now That I Own the BBC" is a song by American pop and rock duo Sparks, which was released in Europe in 1995 and the UK in 1996 as the third and final single from their sixteenth studio album Gratuitous Sax & Senseless Violins (1994). The song was written and produced by Ron Mael and Russell Mael, with additional production by Linus Burdick.

Background
Sparks originally envisioned recording the song using different broadcasting company names in the title and lyrics, and releasing them as singles in their respective countries. In a 1996 interview with VH1, Ron Mael revealed, "We were actually thinking at one point of making this a song that would be different in every single country. It would be NBC for America and BBC for Britain, but at a certain point it got just too overwhelming and RTL doesn't rhyme with anything, so we just kept it as the BBC."

Music video
The song's music video features Sparks on board an animated 'BBC ship'. It was directed by Olivier Kuntzel and Florence Deygas, who were also responsible for the video's animation.

Critical reception
On its release as a single in the UK, the Newark Advertiser described the song as "techno-dance weirdness" and added, "Vocal version and two mindbending instrumental opportunities missed by the insertion of vocal snatches."

Track listing

1995 European release

1996 UK release

Charts

References

1994 songs
1995 singles
1996 singles
Sparks (band) songs
Songs written by Ron Mael
Songs written by Russell Mael
Logic Records singles